Essam Eldin Khalil Hassan Khalil is an Egyptian Mechanical Engineer. Khalil is a professor in the mechanical power department at Cairo University. He is the author and co-author of several international researches in HVAC field. He has many years of experience in delivering courses in air-conditioning to University, college students, to building managers and maintenance staff in both the industrial and commercial sectors in Egypt, the Arabian countries and worldwide.
He has been selected by various universities and international organisations to lecture to graduate and post graduate level engineers, managers, supervisors and operating personnel on the subjects of HVAC design and optimisation, HVAC system management, energy utilization, waste heat recovery, plant management and other related subjects.

Khalil is ASME, AIAA and ASHRAE active fellow and is an ASHRAE distinguished lecturer on two topics; Ventilation of tombs of valley of kings and design of air conditioning systems for surgical operating theatres. The tombs include King Tutankh Amen, Ramses VII, Amhotep, Horemoheb, Ramses IV,V as well as Bay. It also includes the design of Air conditioning of the Hanging Church of Christ in Cairo.

Khalil is also the chairman of National HVAC Committee in Egypt, member of the National Energy Code Committee of Egypt and the chair of HVAC sub-group. He is a registered HVAC consultant and the president of the Arab Air Conditioning Code Committee. Khalil is the Convenor of ISO TC205 WG2 (Design of Energy Efficient Buildings) and is an active member of ISO TC163 Committee. He is the Chairman of Consulting Engineering Bureau, CEB.

Biography

Academic accomplishments

Khalil achieved his M.Sc. Degree in Mechanical Engineering from Cairo University in December 1973. In February 1977 he was able to achieve his Ph.D. degree in Mechanical Engineering at London University, Imperial College of Science and Technology, UK.
In 1977, the same year he achieved his Ph.D., Khalil acquired a Diploma of Imperial College at London University and a Postdoctoral Fellowship at Imperial College, London with the Support of Harwell Atomic Energy Research Establishment, United Kingdom. Khalil has published more than 700 papers on mechanical engineering.

Continual contribution

Research
Khalil is a productive contributors to the research in the fields of Combustion, Thermal Power and Heat Transfer. In addition to eight books, he has had more than 360 papers published some in journals and some papers discussed in symposiums.

Design consultancy
Khalil is a registered consultant who had contributions in major projects including ventilation of the tombs of the valley of kings, theatres and Cinema of Egypt, the Parliament of Egypt, studios, more than 64 big Hospitals, 15 luxurious hotels, more than 14 different buildings, fire fighting & detection design, hot water system, Laundry system, Kitchen system, Electric power supply works, light current and sound systems in factories, institutes and other various contributions.

Awards and honors
Khalil achieved a number of awards and honors including:
 Cairo University Award of Excellence, May 2015
 Cairo University Award of Excellence, April 2014
 ASME Egypt Achievement Award, April 2013
 University of Wisconsin, Milwaukee Distinguished Lecture Award, January 2013 
 Cairo University Award of Excellence, January 2013
ASME 2012 James Harry Potter Gold Medal, 2012
Cairo University Award of Excellence, July 2012 
ASHRAE 2011 Distinguished Services Award, 2011
AIAA 2011 Sustained Service Award, 2011
ASHRAE 2010 Regional Award of Merit, 2010 
AIAA Energy Systems Award, 2010  
Cairo University Award of Excellence, July 2010 
ASME/George Westinghouse Gold Medal, 2009 
ASHRAE Fellow Award, 2009 
ASHRAE Chapter Service Award, October 2009 
ASHRAE Presidential Award of Excellence, Sustainability Activities, October 2009 
Cairo University Award of Excellence, April 2009 
AIAA Fellow Award, 2008 
Best Paper Award, AIAA, IECEC, July 2008 
Cairo University Award of Excellence, June 2007 
Member of L’Institut D’Egypte, April 2007 
Cairo University Award of Excellence, April 2006 
Best Paper Award, AIAA, IECEC, August 2005 
ASME Fellow Award 2003 
ESME Fellow Award, 1991 
National Award for Scientific Achievement in Engineering Sciences in (1981). 
Decor Of Science And Arts From Egyptian President, 1st Order, 1981

Books published in the field of Mechanical Engineering
 FLOW, MIXING & HEAT TRANSFER IN FURNACES (WITH K.H. KHALIL & F. M. ELMAHALLAWY) H.M.T. SERIES-VOLUMES 2, PERGAMON PRESS. JUNE-1978.
 HEAT & FLUID IN POWER SYSTEM COMPONENTS (WITH A.M. RESK & M. M.KAMEL)
 H.M.T. SERIES VOLUME 3, PERGAMON PRESS. NOVEMBER- 1979.
 MODELING OF FURNACES & COMBUSTORS. ABACUS PRESS, 1ST ED 1983.
 LASER TECHNOLOGY, GEBO, Egypt, 1987 (In Arabic)
 POWER PLANT DESIGN. ABACUS PRESS, GORDON & BREECH 1990.
 ENERGY FUTURE, ACADEMIC BOOKSHOP PUBLISHERS, 1999 (In Arabic)
 WATER DESALINATION, ACADEMIC BOOKSHOP PUBLISHERS, 1999 (In Arabic)
 Types and Performance of Pumps and Compressors, UNESCO_Ellos, 2012
 Air Conditioning Of Hospitals And Healthcare Facilities, Lap Lambert Publishing, 2012,
 Air Distribution in Buildings, Taylor & Francis, CRC Press, 2013, 
 Boiler Furnace Design, Lap Lambert Publishing, 2013, 
 Energy Efficiency in the Urban Environment, with (Heba Khalil), Taylor & Francis, CRC Press, 2015,

References

External links
ENERGY EFFICIENT DESALINATION TECHNOLOGY DEVELOPMENT IN EGYPTIAN INDUSTRIES 
AIR-CONDITIONING SYSTEMS’ DEVELOPMENTS IN HOSPITALS: COMFORT, AIR QUALITY, AND ENERGY UTILIZATION
CFD APPLICATIONS FOR THE PRESERVATION OF THE TOMBS OF THE VALLEY OF KINGS, LUXOR 
Heat Transfer Characteristics of Turbulent Flames in Furnaces and Combustion Chambers
Predictions of Energy Losses in Furnaces under Transient Conditions 
https://web.archive.org/web/20110811062409/http://aiaa.org/pdf/inside/AIAA_HA_Brochure.pdf

20th-century Egyptian engineers
21st-century Egyptian engineers
1948 births
Cairo University alumni
Academic staff of Cairo University
Egyptian mechanical engineers
Living people
Fellows of ASHRAE